Michiel de Ruiter (born 11 March 1964) is a Dutch freestyle skier. He competed in the men's aerials event at the 1994 Winter Olympics.

References

1964 births
Living people
Dutch male freestyle skiers
Olympic freestyle skiers of the Netherlands
Freestyle skiers at the 1994 Winter Olympics
People from Ermelo, Netherlands
Sportspeople from Gelderland
20th-century Dutch people